Frank Richardson Armengol (born 21 April 1962) is a Nicaraguan former swimmer. He competed in three events at the 1976 Summer Olympics. His parents were come from the USA. He is the brother of Michele Richardson who represented the United States at the 1984 Summer Olympics, winning a silver medal in the women's 800 metres freestyle. He is of American and Cuban descent.

References

External links
 

1962 births
Living people
Nicaraguan male swimmers
Olympic swimmers of Nicaragua
Swimmers at the 1976 Summer Olympics
Sportspeople from Managua
Nicaraguan people of American descent
Nicaraguan people of Cuban descent